La Portella is a municipality in the comarca of the Segrià in Catalonia, Spain. It is situated on the right bank of the Noguera Ribagorçana river. A local road links the municipality with Lleida.

Demography

Note 
 La Portella became part of the Segrià in the comarcal revision of 1990: previously it formed part of the Noguera.

References

 Panareda Clopés, Josep Maria; Rios Calvet, Jaume; Rabella Vives, Josep Maria (1989). Guia de Catalunya, Barcelona: Caixa de Catalunya.  (Spanish).  (Catalan).

External links
Official website 
 Government data pages 

Municipalities in Segrià
Populated places in Segrià